Public holidays in Samoa are defined in the Public Holidays Act 2008:

In addition to holidays with fixed dates, polling day and the day before polling day is a public holiday in any year when an election is held. In addition, the O le Ao o le Malo can declare public holidays in accordance with the Act.

References

Samoa
Events in Samoa
Holidays
Samoa